Under the Iron Sea is the second studio album by the English rock band Keane, released on 12 June 2006. During its first week on sale in the UK, the album opened at number one, selling 222,297 copies according to figures from the Official Chart Company. In the United States, the album debuted at number four on the Billboard 200, selling 75,000 copies in its first week there. Since its release, the album has sold over three million copies worldwide.

The band describes Under the Iron Sea as a progression from Hopes and Fears with electronic influences, and as a "sinister fairytale-world-gone-wrong".

Background and development

After the release of their debut album, Hopes and Fears, Keane embarked upon a world tour, which reached virtually all Europe and North America and which concluded in October 2005. As seen on Strangers, the band had been having trouble since the middle of 2004, shortly after the release of the debut. "Hamburg Song", composed circa August 2004, deals with the strained relationship between singer Tom Chaplin and pianist Tim Rice-Oxley. During the tour, Rice-Oxley kept composing new songs that would later appear on future releases, such as the B-sides "Let It Slide" and "Thin Air". According to Chaplin, Rice-Oxley had composed at least 50 tracks as of April 2006.

The name of the album is based on a lyric in the track "Crystal Ball", which reads "I've lost my heart, I buried it too deep, under the Iron Sea". It also shares its title with the eighth track, "The Iron Sea", Keane's first instrumental piece. The "Iron Sea" is the metaphorical name for the group's (especially Rice-Oxley's) preoccupations about their uncertain future and the sudden fame they had to deal with.

The album's title was announced by a handwritten note, signed by the entire band, reading:

"Nothing in My Way" (previously known as "Nothing in Your Way"), "Try Again" and "Hamburg Song" debuted between late 2004 and 2005 during the Hopes and Fears Tour. The latter two songs made their first appearance on Strangers, still in demo versions, while the first only appeared until the album's release. The first three singles, "Atlantic", "Is It Any Wonder?" and "Crystal Ball", were premiered at a secret gig in London on 5 April.

Notable changes from the previous releases by Keane during the Hopes and Fears era are the typeface and style of the cover art. Sanna Annukka, an artist from Brighton, designed the cover art for the album and its singles. The typeface changed from the "Cochin" typeface used on the 2004 and 2005 releases. The newer font was specially designed for Keane (but no specific name for the font was given apart from the "UTIS" fan-name).

Release and promotion

The first pre-release before the album was "Atlantic", which was issued as a download-only music video single on 25 April, featuring a specially extended version of the song incorporating the outro from album track "The Iron Sea". Irvine Welsh, author of the novel Trainspotting, directed the video, which was filmed in black and white on a remote Sussex beach, and did not feature the band. "Is It Any Wonder?" followed as the first single proper on 29 May. Its video was directed by Kevin Godley, best known for his work on music videos for The Police and Duran Duran in the mid-1980s.

The record was released on 12 June 2006 internationally. However, the album was accidentally put on sale for a few hours on 2 June 2006 by Apple Computer's Belgian iTunes Music Store. A US edition of the album eventually leaked in its entirety to file-sharing networks on 5 June 2006, and the Mexican edition was released early on 9 June.

The release was accompanied by a bonus DVD with a book-shaped cover representing a fairy-tale story, with drawings on the inner pages.

Reception

Under the Iron Sea received generally favourable reviews from critics. Review aggregating website Metacritic reports a normalised score of 63/100, based on 24 reviews, indicating "generally favorable" reviews.

In 2008, Under the Iron Sea was voted the 8th best British album of all time by a poll conducted by Q Magazine and HMV.

Track listing

Bonus DVD

Videos
 Recording Under the Iron Sea – 23:55
 Short film set to an extended version of "Atlantic" – 6:01
 "Is It Any Wonder?" (video) – 3:01
 Making the Is It Any Wonder? Video – 7:50

Works in progress
 "Atlantic" (demo 29 January 2005) – 4:15
 "Is It Any Wonder?" (demo 31 March 2005) – 2:58
 "Nothing in My Way" (live from Aragon Theater, Chicago 19 May 2005) – 4:10
 "Leaving So Soon?" (demo 29 October 2005)
 "A Bad Dream" (demo 7 July 2005)
 "Hamburg Song" (live from Aragon Theater, Chicago 19 May 2005)
 "Put It Behind You" (demo 9 January 2005)
 "The Iron Sea" (Helioscentric recording session 9 April 2005)
 "Crystal Ball" (demo 7 July 2005)
 "Try Again" (live from Aragon Theater, Chicago 19 May 2005)
 "Broken Toy" (demo 30 August 2005) – 5:39
 "The Frog Prince" (demo 7 July 2005) – 3:44

Latin American tour edition bonus DVD
"Atlantic" (video)
"Is It Any Wonder?" (video)
"Crystal Ball" (video)
"Nothing in My Way" (video)
"A Bad Dream" (video)
The Making of 'Is It Any Wonder?' (video)

Taiwanese limited edition bonus DVD
"Is It Any Wonder?" (video)
"Crystal Ball" (band version)
"Nothing in My Way" (video)
"Atlantic" (video)
The Making of 'Is It Any Wonder?' (video)

Hidden content
Inserting the CD whilst on the band's  allows one to unlock exclusive content including:
Original demo of "Atlantic"
A live recording of "Is It Any Wonder?"
Live video footage of "Atlantic" from the show at ULU
A free ringtone of "The Iron Sea" for mobile download (UK consumers only)
Wallpaper images
An exclusive Keane screensaver

Track information
"Atlantic"
 "Atlantic" was the first single off the album, released as a download video. It was featured in the TV series CSI: NY in the eighth episode of the third season, "Consequences".

"Is It Any Wonder?"
 "Is It Any Wonder" is the only Keane song completely composed using distortion piano effects pedals.

"Nothing in My Way"
 The song was released as the fourth single from the album. It was previously called "Nothing in Your Way".

"Leaving So Soon?"

"Leaving So Soon?" was the last song composed for the album, in 2005. The song is considered a fan favourite and it is the Keane song with the third highest tempo to date (144 bpm), next to "You Haven't Told Me Anything" (152 bpm) on the band's next album Perfect Symmetry and "On the Road" (157 bpm) from their fourth album, Strangeland.

"A Bad Dream"
 This song was released as the last single from the album in early 2007.

"Hamburg Song"

"Hamburg Song" is the only organ-voice Keane song to date. The song is about Rice-Oxley's troubles with Tom Chaplin and how he feels. The song was premiered on 20 October 2004 as a demo. The final version was slowed down and the organ sound was changed a little. It does not feature drums but a few ride crashes on the outro.

"Put It Behind You"

Composed in mid-2004 after Richard's break-up with his girlfriend. The song was first mentioned on Strangers by Rice-Oxley. A demo version of this song is included on the Under the Iron Sea DVD. During live performances of this song, the three members of the band sing on the main chorus, contrary to the album version, in which Hughes does not sing.

"The Iron Sea"

Rice-Oxley composed the track in 2004, and it appears as a demo on Strangers, with Tim playing it at Helioscentric Studios. On the UK version, "The Iron Sea" is the eighth track but on the international version it is a hidden track after "Put It Behind You". The outro was also used on the single version of "Atlantic". The place where the track title should be on the CD track list is marked as a change in the font colour (from dark blue to royal blue).

"Crystal Ball"
 This song was the third single released, charting at number 20.

"Try Again"
 The song was released only in Germany as the fifth single from the album, in a three-CD maxi-single format.

"Broken Toy"

This is the longest song recorded by Keane on any of their releases, at 6:07 in length (the longest song recorded is the rare track "The Happy Soldier" at 7:43).

"The Frog Prince"
 The closing track was a song written about another musician who Rice-Oxley described as 'talented, but very arrogant'. It has been suggested the musician is Johnny Borrell from the band Razorlight.

Personnel

Keane
Tom Chaplin – lead vocals, organ, piano, guitar
Tim Rice-Oxley – piano, bass guitar, keyboards, synthesizers, composition, backing vocals
Richard Hughes – drums, percussion

Additional personnel
Andy Green – production, programming and engineering
Julian Willmott – additional engineering and Pro Tools editing
Mark "Spike" Stent – mixing
Alex Dromgoole – mixing assistance
David Emery – additional mixing assistance
Ted Jensen – mastering (at Sterling Sound)
Sanna Annukka – cover design
Richard Andrews – art direction (for Big Active)
Gerard Saint – art direction (for Big Active)

Charts

Weekly charts

Year-end charts

Certifications

See also
List of songs by Keane

References

External links
 Under the Iron Sea at Keaneshaped
 Under the Iron Sea album review at UKEvents.net

2006 albums
Island Records albums
Keane (band) albums